Sar Tap may refer to:
 Sar Tap, Iranshahr
 Sartap, Sarbuk, Qasr-e Qand County